Dylan Brown (born 21 June 2000) is a New Zealand professional rugby league footballer who plays as a  for the Parramatta Eels in the NRL and New Zealand at international level.

Background
Brown was born in Auckland and grew up in Whangarei, New Zealand and is of Samoan, Māori and Niuean heritage. 

He played his junior rugby league for the Hikurangi Stags. 

At age of 15, Brown moved to Sydney, Australia to pursue an NRL career with the Parramatta Eels. He attended and graduated from The Hills Sports High School.

Early career
Brown played for Parramatta's Harold Matthews Cup and S.G ball squad. In 2017 he led the S.G. Ball Squad to the grand final where they were victorious 30–22 over the Cronulla-Sutherland Sharks. 

Later on in the year he went on to debut for the Eels in the under 20s Holden cup team in the middle of the 2017 season, at the age of 17. In 2017, Brown led the Holden Cup squad to the NYC Grand Final, losing to the Manly-Warringah Sea Eagles. 

Brown was then selected in the Australian Schoolboys later in the year at five-eighth, but withdrew from injury.

Playing career

2018
In 2018, Brown started the year with a Jersey Flegg Cup and training on and off with first grade. 

Towards the end of the year he debuted for the Wentworthville Magpies in the NSW Cup, playing five games. 

This led him to being promoted to Parramatta's first grade squad for the 2019 season, re-signing with the club until the end of the 2020 NRL season.

2019
On 17 March 2019 Brown made his NRL debut in round 1 against the Penrith Panthers in a 20–12 win.

On 24 March 2019 Brown scored his first NRL try in round 2 against the Canterbury-Bankstown Bulldogs in a 36–16 win.

On 2 April 2019, Brown was ruled out indefinitely after sustaining bone bruising on his back.  It was reported that Brown had been suffering with the injury for an extended period and would sit out opposed training sessions to protect himself in order to play in matches.

In Round 15 against Canberra Raiders, Brown made his long-awaited return from injury as Parramatta came from 16-0 down to win 22–16 at TIO Stadium in Darwin.

At the end of the 2019 regular season, Parramatta finished fifth on the table and qualified for the finals.  In the elimination final against Brisbane, Brown scored two tries as Parramatta won the match 58–0 at the new Western Sydney Stadium.  The victory was the biggest finals win in history, eclipsing Newtown's 55–7 win over St George in 1944.  The match was also Parramatta's biggest win over Brisbane and, at the time, Brisbane's worst ever loss since entering the competition in 1988.

On 3 December 2019, Brown signed a three-year extension, until 2023, with Parramatta worth $2 million.

2020
In round 2 of the 2020 NRL season, Brown scored two tries as Parramatta defeated the hapless Gold Coast side 46–6.

In round 16 of the 2020 NRL season, Brown was taken from the field with an ankle injury during Parramatta's 38–0 loss to South Sydney Rabbitohs.  It was later revealed that Brown would require surgery on his ankle and would be ruled out indefinitely.

2021
In round 9 of the 2021 NRL season, Brown was placed on report after diving over the top of Sydney Roosters player Drew Hutchison as he was in the act of scoring a try.  Hutchison was rushed to hospital during the game with suspected broken ribs and a punctured lung.  Brown was later suspended for three weeks over the incident.

Brown made a total of 21 appearances and scored four tries in Parramatta's 2021 NRL season including the club's two finals matches against Newcastle and Penrith.

2022
In round 12 of the 2022 NRL season, Brown scored two tries including the winner in a 28-20 victory over Canberra.
He made his international debut for New Zealand against Tonga in June.
In round 23, Brown scored two tries for Parramatta in a 42-6 victory over arch-rivals Canterbury.
Brown played every game for Parramatta throughout 2022 including the clubs 2022 NRL Grand Final loss to Penrith.
In October Brown was named in the New Zealand squad for the 2021 Rugby League World Cup.
On 19 December, Brown re-signed with Parramatta until the end of 2025, with options to extend until 2031.

References

External links

Eels profile

2000 births
Living people
New Zealand rugby league players
New Zealand national rugby league team players
New Zealand sportspeople of Samoan descent
Parramatta Eels players
Rugby league five-eighths
Rugby league halfbacks
Rugby league players from Auckland
Wentworthville Magpies players